Bernard Labadie (born March 27, 1963) is a conductor of classical and baroque music, artistic director, and musical director. He was born in Quebec City, Canada and graduated from the School of Music at Laval University. During Labadie's education at Laval University in 1983, Labadie directed his first orchestras as a student project. He studied Gregorian chant with Dom Jean Claire at the Saint-Pierre de Solesmes Abby in France and conducted privately with Simon Streatfeild (1983–87), Pierre Dervaux at the Domaine Forget (1986, 1987), in Saumur, France (1987), and briefly at the Bachakademie in Stuttgart, Germany with John Eliot Gardiner (1991).

Career 
After Labadie's graduation at Laval University, he founded the ensembles Les Violons du Roy in 1984 and the choir La Chapelle de Québec (under the original name l'Ensemble vocal Bernard Labadie) in 1985. Labadie would be the musical director of Les Violons du Roy from its creation in 1985 to 2014 and is the musical director of La Chapelle de Québec to this day.

He directed the Québec premiere of Monteverdi's L'Incoronazione di Poppea in 1984.

In 1987-88 Labadie was apprentice conductor with the Orchestre symphonique de Québec, and he conducted the Orchestre symphonique de Québec chorus 1989–95.

Since 1989, he was appointed as the choral director of the Orchestra symphonique de Québec.

In 1995, he made his debut with the Nihon Shinsei Symphony Orchestra in Tokyo conducting J.S. Bach's St. Matthew Passion (BWV 244).

As guest conductor, Bernard Labadie has conducted every major symphony orchestra in Canada, and has been invited to orchestras across the United States after his debut with the Minnesota Orchestra in 1999.

He took over as the artistic director of the Opéra de Québec from 1994 to 2003 and as artistic director for the Opéra de Montréal from 2002 to 2006. He made his Metropolitan Opera debut during the 2009–2010 season with Mozart's Die Zauberflöte, a work he also led at the Cincinnati Opera in 2011 and made his 2017 debut at the Canadian Opera Company.

In September 2018 Labadie would be appointed as music director of the Orchestra of St Luke's, Labadie is the Orchestra of St Luke's fifth titled conductor, joining their list of previous conductors including Pablo Heras-Casado (2011-2017), Roger Norrington (1990-1994), Charles Mackerras (1998-2001), and Donald Runnicles (2001-2007).

Discography 
• Mozart: Flute Concerto: Flute and Harp Concerto; Andante in C (1989)

• Pergolesi: Stabat Mater; Vivaldi: Motet "In furore guistissimae irae"; Stabat Mater (1994)

• Bach: Secular Cantatas (1994)

• Music of Bach's Sons (1996)

• Bach: Goldberg Variations (2000)

• Bach: Art of the Fugue (2001)

Awards 
• Sir Ernest MacMillan Memorial Foundation Young Musician Award (1987)

• Officer of the Order of Canada (2005)

• Chevalier de l’Ordre National du Québec (2006)

• Samuel de Champlain award (2016)

References 

1963 births
Living people